The National Movement Party is a political party in Libya founded by Libyan journalist and human righs activist Leila bin Khalifa inspired by the 1940s Bashir El Saadawi movement and the defunct National Congress Party.

In 2021, the National Movement Party nominated Leila bin Khalifa as their presidential candidate in the first Libyan presidential election since the independence of this country.

References

Political parties in Libya